Yung Yim King (born 12 July 1959) is a Hong Kong fencer. She competed in the women's individual foil event at the 1988 Summer Olympics.

References

External links
 

1959 births
Living people
Hong Kong female foil fencers
Olympic fencers of Hong Kong
Fencers at the 1988 Summer Olympics